The Producers is a 2005 American musical comedy film directed by Susan Stroman and written by Mel Brooks and Thomas Meehan based on the eponymous 2001 Broadway musical, which in turn was based on Brooks's 1967 film of the same name. The film stars an ensemble cast led by Nathan Lane, Matthew Broderick, Uma Thurman, Will Ferrell, Gary Beach, Roger Bart, and Jon Lovitz. Creature effects were provided by Jim Henson's Creature Shop.

The film was released in the United States by Universal Pictures in a limited release on December 16, 2005, followed by a wide release on December 25. It garnered generally mixed reviews from critics and was a commercial failure, earning $38 million worldwide from a $45 million budget.

Plot
In 1959, following the flop of the theatrical musical Funny Boy (based on William Shakespeare's Hamlet) ("Opening Night"), the show's washed-up producer, Max Bialystock, hires the neurotic Leo Bloom as his accountant. While studying Max's books, Leo notes that as a flop is expected to lose money, the IRS will not investigate the finances of failed productions. Leo jests that by selling an excess of shares and embezzling the funds, a flop could generate up to $2 million. Max asks for Leo's help with the scheme, only for the latter to refuse ("We Can Do It").

Returning to his old accounting firm, Leo starts fantasizing about being a Broadway producer ("I Wanna Be a Producer"). Leo quits his job and forms "Bialystock & Bloom" with Max. Searching for the worst play ever written, the duo finds Springtime for Hitler, a musical written by an ex-Nazi named Franz Liebkind. Max and Leo, in order to acquire Franz's rights to the musical, perform Hitler's favorite song and swear the sacred "Siegfried Oath" to him ("Der Guten Tag Hop-Clop").

In order to ensure the play's failure, Max and Leo meet failing, flamboyant director Roger De Bris and his assistant Carmen Ghia. Roger is reluctant to direct, but when Max and Leo suggest he could win a Tony Award, he agrees on the condition that the play be more "gay" ("Keep It Gay"). Back at their office, a Swedish woman named Ulla appears to audition. Although Leo points out that they have not started casting, Max hires her as their secretary until they audition her later ("When You've Got It, Flaunt It").

To gain backers to fund the musical, Max has dalliances with several elderly women ("Along Came Bialy"), allowing him to raise the $2 million. Leo laments about the dangers of sex distracting him from his work, and shares a kiss with Ulla ("That Face"). At auditions for the role of Hitler, Franz, angered at a performer's rendition of a German song, storms the stage and performs it himself ("Haben Sie gehört das Deutsche Band?"). Based on the performance, Max hires Franz to play Hitler.

On opening night, as the cast and crew prepare to go on stage, Leo wishes everyone good luck, to which everyone warns it is bad luck to say "good luck" on opening night, and that the correct phrase is to say "break a leg" ("You Never Say Good Luck on Opening Night"). Franz leaves to prepare and literally breaks his leg in a fall. Max enlists Roger to perform the role in his place, and Roger accepts.

As the show opens, the audience is horrified at the first song ("Springtime for Hitler"), and people begin leaving out of disgust until Roger enters as Hitler ("Heil Myself"). Roger, playing Hitler very flamboyantly, causes the audience to misinterpret the play as satire, resulting in the show becoming a smash. Terrified the IRS will learn of their crimes, a dispute breaks out between Max and Leo, but stops when Roger and Carmen come into the office to congratulate them. Furious at Roger for making the play successful, Max angrily confronts Roger for his actions, and even goes as far to physically torture Carmen when he tries to defend Roger. Franz then appears and attempts to shoot all four of them for breaking the Siegfried Oath by mocking Hitler, only to attract the police. As Max and Franz attempt to evade the police, Franz breaks his other leg.

Arrested for his tax fraud, Max is imprisoned while Leo elopes with Ulla to Rio de Janeiro ("Betrayed"). About to be sentenced, Max is saved by Leo, who returns to defend him ("Til Him"). The judge, realizing Max and Leo are inseparable, sentences them both to five years at Sing Sing Prison with Franz. Writing and producing a new musical in prison ("Prisoners of Love"), Leo, Max, and Franz are pardoned by the governor for their work, allowing them to collaborate with Roger and Ulla and release Prisoners of Love. The play's success means Max and Leo go on to become successful Broadway producers.

In a post-credits scene, the cast sings "Goodbye!", telling the audience to leave the theater.

Cast
 Nathan Lane as Max Bialystock
 Matthew Broderick as Leopold "Leo" Bloom
 Uma Thurman as Ulla Inga Hansen Benson Yansen Tallen Hallen Svaden Swanson (later Bloom) 
 Will Ferrell as Franz Liebkind
 Gary Beach as Roger De Bris
 Roger Bart as Carmen Ghia
 Jon Lovitz as Mr. Marks
 Michael McKean as Prison Trustee
 David Huddleston as Judge
 Richard Kind as Jury Foreman
 Eileen Essell as Hold Me-Touch Me
 Debra Monk as Lick Me-Bite Me
 Andrea Martin as Kiss Me-Feel Me
 John Barrowman as the Lead Tenor Stormtrooper
 Brent Barrett as Brian
 Peter Bartlett as Kevin
 Jim Borstelmann as Scott, Donald Dinsmore
 Kathy Fitzgerald as Shirley Markowitz
 Roland Rusinek as Jack Lepidus and soundtrack vocalist
 Jason Antoon as Jason Green
 Bryn Dowling and Meg Gillentine as Usherettes 
 Marilyn Sokol as Bag Lady
 Danny Mastrogiorgio as Jail Guard
 Mel Brooks as himself, voices of Tom the Cat, Hilda the Pigeon and German Soldier

Puppeteers (Franz Liebkind segment)
 Fran Brill – Pigeon
 Tyler Bunch – Pigeon
 James Kroupa – Pigeon
 Tim Lagasse – Pigeon
 Peter Linz – Pigeon
 Drew Massey – Pigeon
 Joey Mazzarino – Pigeon
 Martin P. Robinson – Pigeon
 Matt Vogel – Pigeon
 Victor Yerrid – Tom the Cat, Hilda the Pigeon, Adolf the Pigeon

Lane, Broderick, Beach and Bart reprise their roles from the stage musical. Nicole Kidman was originally cast as Ulla but backed out of the project due to her other commitments.

Soundtrack

Additional tracks: 21) "The Hop-Clop Goes On" 3:34, 22) "Goodbye!" 0:37, 23) "The King Of Broadway (Bonus Track) 4:38

Reception

Box office
The film grossed $19 million at the box office in North America and another $18 million overseas, which brings the worldwide total of $38 million. The film’s failure was partly due to its competition with King Kong, The Chronicles of Narnia: The Lion, the Witch and the Wardrobe, Fun with Dick and Jane, and Memoirs of a Geisha.

Critical response
On Rotten Tomatoes, the film holds an approval rating of 50% based on 153 reviews, with an average rating of 5.4/10. The site's critical consensus reads, "Despite the rich source material, The Producers has a stale, stagy feel more suited to the theater than the big screen." On Metacritic, the film has a weighted average score of 52 out of 100, based on 36 critics, indicating "mixed or average reviews". Audiences polled by CinemaScore gave the film an average grade of "B+" on an A+ to F scale.

A positive review from Betty Jo Tucker of Reel Talk said: "Outrageous musical numbers evoke most of the laughs in this movie funfest. Eat your heart out, Rockettes, because here comes a little old ladies' chorus line ('Along Came Bialy') to rival your success. Watch out, real-life producers, for an actor named Gary Beach ('Heil Myself'). Never, and I mean never, hire him if you want your play to flop! And stop spinning in your grave, Florenz Ziegfeld. Those 'Springtime for Hitler and Germany' showgirls are all in good fun. Finally, congratulations to director Susan Stroman, for making this Broadway gem into a film that old-time movie musical fans like me can cheer about."

Nathan Rabin wrote: "Between the rough start and an ending that lingers too long, there's a solid hour or so of terrific entertainment that serves as both a giddy tribute to Broadway musicals and a parody thereof. Thirty-seven years after Brooks declared war on taste and propriety, The Producers has lost its power to shock or offend, but it's retained its ability to amuse."

Roger Ebert cited difficulty in reviewing the film due to familiarity with the original 1967 film. However, he did state that the new version was "fun" and gave it three out of four stars. Said Ebert: "The new movie is a success, that I know. How much of a success, I cannot be sure."

In addition to these positive reviews, it was nominated for four Golden Globes (including nominations for actors Ferrell and Lane).

Most negative reviews suggested that the performances were tuned more for the theater rather than for film. Stephanie Zacharek observed: "The Producers is essentially a filmed version of a stage play, in which none of the characters' expressions or line readings have been scaled down to make sense on-screen. Every gesture is played out as if the actors were 20 feet away in real life, which means that, by the time the performers are magnified on the big screen, they're practically sitting in your lap. The effect is something like watching a 3-D IMAX film without the special glasses."

In addition to these negative reviews, it was nominated for five Stinkers Bad Movie Awards (Worst Director, Worst Remake, Worst Actor for Broderick, Least Dynamic Duo for Broderick and Lane, and Worst Song for "Keep It Gay") along with winning a special "Annie Award", which criticised the decision to sell tickets for the film for an additional $2.50; the name reflects a decision similarly used by the film Annie.

Jimmy Kimmel Live sketch
On February 28, 2016, a five-minute short film serving as a sequel to The Producers, entitled Trumped, was released on Jimmy Kimmel Live!, with Nathan Lane and Matthew Broderick reprising their roles as Max Bialystock and Leopold "Leo" Bloom. The film follows Bialystock & Bloom having formed their own Political Consultants business, which has since fallen on hard times. Bloom realises that under the right circumstances more money can be made from a losing candidate than from a winner. They choose Donald Trump as a candidate, only for him to become a political phenomenon.

See also

References

External links

 
 
 

2005 films
2005 comedy films
2005 directorial debut films
2005 LGBT-related films
2000s American films
2000s English-language films
2000s musical comedy films
2000s satirical films
American LGBT-related films
American musical comedy films
Cultural depictions of Adolf Hitler
Remakes of American films
Films about entertainers
Films about Jews and Judaism
Films about musical theatre
Films about fraud
Films based on musicals
Films based on musicals based on films
Films set in 1959
Films set in New York City
Films shot in New York City
Films with screenplays by Mel Brooks
Films with screenplays by Thomas Meehan (writer)
LGBT-related musical comedy films
Adaptations of works by Mel Brooks
Films produced by Mel Brooks
Universal Pictures films
Columbia Pictures films
Brooksfilms films